Max Brimmell (25 June 1920 in London – 17 February 1997 in Sussex) was a British actor.

Filmography

References

External links

1920 births
1997 deaths
Male actors from London
British male film actors
British male television actors
20th-century British male actors